Mendel Kaplan (1936–2009) was a South African Jewish industrialist executive in the firm Cape Gate, philanthropist and community activist.

Mendel Kaplan was born in South Africa. After graduating from Wynberg Boys' High, he received a degree in law from the University of Cape Town in 1958 and an MBA from Columbia University in 1960.

Kaplan was the honorary president of Keren Hayesod and a former chairman of the Jewish Agency's Board of Governors. He financed numerous philanthropic projects in South Africa, Israel and Jewish communities around the world. In 1980, he founded the Isaac and Jessie Kaplan Centre for Jewish Studies at the University of Cape Town. In 2000, he established the South African Jewish Museum.

Kaplan was an Israeli citizen and owned two homes in Israel.
 
He was a keen rugby union fan, and helped set up the South African Jewish Museum.

Kaplan died of a stroke on 19 November 2009.

References

External links
 Cape Gate Home Page
 South African Jewish Museum

Israeli Jews
Jewish philanthropists
South African Jews
South African Zionists
White South African people
South African emigrants to Israel
2009 deaths
1936 births
Alumni of Wynberg Boys' High School
University of Cape Town alumni
South African philanthropists
20th-century philanthropists